A list of films produced in the Soviet Union in 1963 (see 1963 in film).

1963

External links
 Soviet films of 1963 at the Internet Movie Database

1963
Soviet
Films